Michael Joseph Melloy (born January 15, 1948) is a Senior United States circuit judge of the United States Court of Appeals for the Eighth Circuit.

Education and military service
He was born in Dubuque, Iowa and graduated from Wahlert High School in 1966. He received a Bachelor of Arts degree in economics from Loras College in 1970, magna cum laude, and a Juris Doctor from University of Iowa College of Law in 1974, with high distinction. During law school, Melloy interned at the Jo Daviess County, Illinois attorney's office.

Melloy served in the United States Army from 1970 to 1972, and in the United States Army Reserve from 1972 to 1976. He was initially stationed at Fort Leonard Wood.

Legal career 
Melloy practiced primarily civil litigation and also administrative law, real estate, bankruptcy, and tax as an associate and then as a partner at O’Connor & Thomas in Dubuque from 1974 until 1986. He also regularly co-chaired Tom Tauke's congressional campaigns and served in various capacities for Catholic organizations, including the Dubuque Catholic Metropolitan School Board, Clarke University, and the Knights of Columbus.

Federal judicial service

Melloy a judge of the United States Bankruptcy Court for the Northern District of Iowa from 1986 to 1992.

On April 9, 1992, Melloy was nominated by President George H. W. Bush to a seat on the United States District Court for the Northern District of Iowa vacated by David R. Hansen. Melloy was confirmed by the United States Senate on August 12, 1992, and received his commission on August 17, 1992. He served as chief judge from 1992 to 1999. He was also chair of the bankruptcy committee of the Judicial Conference of the United States.

On September 4, 2001, Melloy was nominated by President George W. Bush to a seat on the United States Court of Appeals for the Eighth Circuit vacated by George Gardner Fagg. Melloy was confirmed by the United States Senate on February 11, 2002, by a 91–0 vote. He received his commission on February 14, 2002. Melloy took senior status on February 1, 2013.

On April 2, 2018, the Supreme Court of the United States appointed Melloy as Special Master in the case of Texas v. New Mexico and Colorado.

References

External links

1948 births
Living people
20th-century American judges
21st-century American judges
Iowa lawyers
Iowa state court judges
Judges of the United States Court of Appeals for the Eighth Circuit
Judges of the United States District Court for the Northern District of Iowa
Loras College alumni
People from Dubuque, Iowa
United States Army soldiers
United States court of appeals judges appointed by George W. Bush
United States district court judges appointed by George H. W. Bush
University of Iowa College of Law alumni
Judges of the United States bankruptcy courts
Catholics from Iowa
United States Army reservists